Heinemannia is a genus of moths of the family Elachistidae.

Distribution
Heinemannia  species are found in the Palearctic realm, east up to south-western Siberia.

Taxonomy
The genus is mostly placed in the family Elachistidae, but other authors list it as a member of the family Agonoxenidae.

Selected species
Heinemannia albidorsella (Staudinger, 1877)
Heinemannia festivella (Denis & Schiffermüller, 1775)
Heinemannia laspeyrella (Hübner, 1796)

References

Parametriotinae